Fubang Township is a township in Lancang Lahu Autonomous County, Yunnan, China.

Etymology
The name "Fubang" comes from the first word of the village name "Fuyong" and "Bangnai".

Administrative division
As of 2016, the township is divided into eight villages: 
Fuyong
Saihan
Banshan
Ping'an
Duoyilin
Bangnai
Maliping
Kalang

History
In the Qing dynasty (1644–1911), it came under the jurisdiction of Tusi.

In 1940, it belonged to the 5th District. That same year, the 5th District was revoked and Fubang Township was set up.

After the founding of the Communist State in 1949, the Fubang District was set up. It was merged into Shangyun District in 1958 and restored in 1961. During the Great Leap Forward, it was renamed "Jingfeng Commune" in 1969 and then "Fubang Commune" in 1971. It was incorporated as a township in 1988.

Geography
It lies at the central Lancang Lahu Autonomous County, bordering Zhutang Township to the west, Nanling Township to the south, Shangyun Town and Mujia Township to the north, and Donghe Township to the east.

The Yilin River and Ankang River flow through the township.

Economy
The economy of the township is mainly based on agriculture. Economic crops are mainly corn, wheat, peanut, and tea.

Demographics

As of 2017, the National Bureau of Statistics of China estimates the township's population now to be 21,000.

Transportation
The National Highway G214 winds through the township.

References

Bibliography

Townships of Pu'er City
Divisions of Lancang Lahu Autonomous County